The office of the Mayor of Tulle is a directly elected position. Since 1947 there have been eight mayors; the term of office is for a period of six years. Since 2008, the mayor is Bernard Combes (PS).

List of mayors

References
 Source  MairesGenWeb - Recensement des Maires de France à travers l'Histoire

Tulle
Mayors